Beatles Baby! Is the tenth studio album to be released by Caspar Babypants - aka: Chris Ballew the lead singer of The Presidents of the United States of America.

The album consists of 21 covers of original Beatles songs and for both children and parents. Having not originally planned to record a second Beatles cover album, Ballew decided to make the album after waking up singing "Strawberry Fields Forever" and becoming inspired to learn dozens of Fab Four tracks on his two-string and three-string guitars.

Although recorded on a variety of instruments - many of which that differ greatly from those on the original recordings, Ballew paid homage sonically by copying several recording techniques included hard-panning stereo mixes, between track comments and a three guitar solo on "The End". It has also been revealed that all of the tracks have been mixed to match the volume and levels of every other Caspar Babypants song ever recorded.

The artwork for the album was once again created by Seattle-based artist Kate Endle.

Track listing

References

Children's music albums
2015 albums